Yasser Arafat International Airport ( Maṭār Yāsir 'Arafāt ad-Dawli) , formerly Gaza International Airport and Dahaniya International Airport, is located in the Gaza Strip, between Rafah and Dahaniya, close to the Egyptian border. The facility opened on 24 November 1998, and ceased operation in late 2000, during the Second Intifada. Israel bombed the radar station and control tower on 4 December 2001 and bulldozers cut the runway on 10 January 2002, rendering the airport inoperable.

History
The airport is owned, and was operated, by the Palestinian Authority. It was able to handle 700,000 passengers per year and operated 24 hours per day, 364 days a year. The airport was the home airport for Palestinian Airlines until the airport was closed.

The construction of the airport was provided for in the Oslo II Agreement of 1995. It was built with funding from Japan, Egypt, Saudi Arabia, Spain, and Germany. It was designed by Moroccan architects (modeled after Casablanca airport) and engineers funded by Morocco's King Hassan II. The total cost was $86 million and it was built by Usama Hassan Elkhoudary (El-Khoudary for engineering and contracting). After a year of construction, it opened on 24 November 1998; attendees at the opening ceremony included Yasser Arafat and US President Bill Clinton. At the time, the opening of the airport was described as evidence of progress toward Palestinian statehood. The presence of Israelis was restricted to checking passports and bags. 

Scheduled commercial service at the Gaza airport began on 5 December 1998, when a Palestinian Airlines Fokker 50 departed for Amman, Jordan. Over the following year, the airport received 90,000 passengers and processed more than 100 tons of cargo. By mid-2000, a handful of foreign carriers, including Royal Air Maroc and Egyptair, had introduced flights to Gaza as well.

Second Intifada
The Second Intifada broke out in September 2000, leading to the closure of the airport on 8 October 2000. Although operations resumed shortly thereafter, Israel ultimately decided to shut the airport once more as the situation deteriorated. Airstrikes destroyed the  radar station and control tower on 4 December 2001 and bulldozers cut the runway on 10 January 2002. Its destruction left Gush Katif Airport as the only serviceable runway in Gaza, until it was abandoned in 2004. The closest public airports in the area are Ben Gurion Airport in Israel and El Arish Airport in Egypt. From 2001 to 2006, airport staff still manned the ticket counters and baggage areas, though no aircraft flew into or out of the airport during that period.

In March 2002, the International Civil Aviation Organization (ICAO) strongly condemned Israel for the attack on the airport, which it deemed a violation of the Convention for the Suppression of Unlawful Acts against the Safety of Civil Aviation (Montreal Convention, 1971). The ICAO also urged Israel to take measures to restore the facility to allow its reopening.

On 15 November 2005, after the end of the intifada and the Israeli unilateral withdrawal from the Gaza Strip, Israel and the Palestinian Authority (PA) signed the Agreement on Movement and Access that provided: "The parties agreed on the importance of the [Yasser Arafat International] airport. Discussions will continue on the issues of security arrangements, construction and operation."

Hamas rule in Gaza Strip
The Agreement of 2005 became moot after Hamas formed the Government in the Palestinian Authority (PA) on 29 March 2006, and Israel and the Quartet on the Middle East imposed sanctions against the PA under Hamas and all dialogue with the Hamas PA government ceased. The sanctions were strengthened in the Gaza Strip after the Hamas takeover of the Gaza Strip in June 2007. Since March 2006, no discussions have taken place between Israel and the Hamas government in the Gaza Strip, including in relation to the airport.

Since its closure, thieves have stripped the site of valuable equipment including radars.

Gallery

References

External links
 

1998 establishments in the Palestinian territories
Airports established in 1998
Airports disestablished in 2000
Airports in the Gaza Strip
Buildings and structures in the Gaza Strip
Defunct airports